Palisades School District is a public school district located in Bucks County, Pennsylvania, United States.  It serves Bridgeton, Durham, Nockamixon, Springfield, and Tinicum Townships.  On July 1, 2013, the borough of Riegelsville transferred from the Easton Area School District to Palisades School District.

Location
The Palisades School District is located in approximately 100 square miles of Upper Bucks County, eastern Pennsylvania, and is immediately connected to the Delaware River.
The Palisades School District comprises the following municipalities: Bridgeton, Durham, Nockamixon, Springfield and Tinicum Townships as well as Riegelsville Borough.

Schools

Elementary schools
Durham Nockamixon Elementary School
Springfield Elementary School
Tinicum Elementary School - Extensive renovations to this school were completed in 2012.  A new wing was added to the school and an upgraded HVAC systems utilizing Geothermal technology was added to the entire school.

Middle schools
Palisades Middle School

High schools
Palisades High School

Areas served
Bridgeton Township
Upper Black Eddy
Durham Township
Monroe
Nockamixon Township
Riegelsville 
Springfield Township
Pleasant Valley
Springtown
Tinicum Township
Erwinna
Ottsville

References

External links 
 

School districts in Bucks County, Pennsylvania